The Cobh Heritage Centre is a museum located in Cobh, County Cork, Ireland. It is attached to Cobh railway station.

The "Queenstown Experience", located at the centre, has mostly permanent exhibitions of Irish history. It has held exhibits on life in Ireland through the 18th and 19th centuries, mass emigration, the Great Famine, on penal transportation to Australia, and on the sinking of the RMS Lusitania. It also has an exhibition on the history of the RMS Titanic, whose last port of call before it sank was Cobh (then Queenstown).

The centre is a tourist destination, including with visitors from cruise ships, which often dock in Cobh. The centre has two onsite gift shops and a café.

References

External links 
Cobh Heritage Centre Official website

Irish genealogy
RMS Titanic
Museums in County Cork
History museums in the Republic of Ireland
Maritime museums in the Republic of Ireland
Museums of human migration
1993 establishments in Ireland